Ghouri Express is a passenger train operated daily by Pakistan Railways between Lahore and Faisalabad.

Route
 Lahore Junction–Shahdara Bagh Junction via Karachi–Peshawar Railway Line
 Shahdara Bagh Junction–Sangla Hill Junction via Shahdara Bagh–Sangla Hill Branch Line
 Sangla Hill Junction–Faisalabad via Khanewal–Wazirabad Branch Line

Station stops
 Lahore Junction
 Qila Sheikhupura Junction
 Safdarabad
 Sangla Hill Junction
 Faisalabad

Equipment
The train has economy accommodations.

References

Named passenger trains of Pakistan
Passenger trains in Pakistan